Satyavara Tirtha (c. 1716 - c. 1797) was an Indian philosopher, scholar and the pontiff of Uttaradi Math, a math (mutt) dedicated to Dvaita philosophy. He was the successor of Satyasandha Tirtha and the 27th pontiff of Uttaradi Math since Madhvacharya, the chief proponent and the one who rejuvenated this Dvaita philosophy and served the pontificate from 1794 to 1797.

Works
The number of extant works ascribed to Satyavara Tirtha are only two in number. One is the commentary on Nyaya Sudha of Jayatirtha and the second work is a commentary on Mahabharata Tatparya Nirnaya of Sri Madhvacharya.

References

Bibliography

 

Indian Hindu saints
Madhva religious leaders
Uttaradi Math
Dvaitin philosophers
18th-century Indian philosophers
Scholars from Karnataka